Minolia nyssonus is a species of sea snail, a marine gastropod mollusk in the family Solariellidae.

Distribution
This marine species occurs off Japan at depths between 150 m and 200 m.

References

 Hasegawa K. (2009) Upper bathyal gastropods of the Pacific coast of northern Honshu, Japan, chiefly collected by R/V Wakataka-maru. In: T. Fujita (ed.), Deep-sea fauna and pollutants off Pacific coast of northern Japan.  National Museum of Nature and Science Monographs 39: 225–383.
 Higo, S., Callomon, P. & Goto, Y. (1999). Catalogue and bibliography of the marine shell-bearing Mollusca of Japan. Osaka. : Elle Scientific Publications. 749 pp.
 Williams S.T., Smith L.M., Herbert D.G., Marshall B.A., Warén A., Kiel S., Dyal P., Linse K., Vilvens C. & Kano Y. (2013) Cenozoic climate change and diversification on the continental shelf and slope: evolution of gastropod diversity in the family Solariellidae (Trochoidea). Ecology and Evolution 3(4): 887–917

nyssonus
Gastropods described in 1919